Tomohiro Kondo (born 17 June 1977) is a Japanese professional golfer.

Kondo was born in Tōkai, Aichi, Japan. He won the gold medal at the 1998 Asian Games.

After turning professional, Kondo joined the Japan Golf Tour. He has five wins on the Japan Golf Tour, winning twice in 2006, and once in 2007, 2008, 2011, and 2014.

Kondo managed to qualify for The Open Championship three times; 2007, 2009, 2014. Missing the cut each time

Professional wins (7)

Japan Golf Tour wins (6)

Japan Golf Tour playoff record (2–5)

Other wins (1)
1998 Asian Games

Results in major championships

CUT = missed the half-way cut
Note: Kondo only played in The Open Championship.

Team appearances
Amateur
Eisenhower Trophy (representing Japan): 1998

Professional
Dynasty Cup (representing Japan): 2003, 2005

References

External links

Japanese male golfers
Japan Golf Tour golfers
Asian Games medalists in golf
Asian Games gold medalists for Japan
Golfers at the 1998 Asian Games
Medalists at the 1998 Asian Games
People from Tōkai, Aichi
Sportspeople from Aichi Prefecture
1977 births
Living people